The Oklahoma Sooners are the athletic teams that represent the University of Oklahoma, located in Norman. The 19 men's and women's varsity teams are called the "Sooners", a reference to a nickname given to the early participants in the Land Run of 1889, which initially opened the Unassigned Lands in the future state of Oklahoma to non-native settlement. The university's athletic teams compete in the National Collegiate Athletic Association (NCAA)'s Division I in the Big 12 Conference. The university's current athletic director is Joe Castiglione.

In 2002, the University of Oklahoma was ranked as the Third best college sports program in America by Sports Illustrated.

Sports sponsored 

The University of Oklahoma was a charter member of the Southwest Athletic Conference (SWC) during its formation in 1914. Five years later, in 1919, OU left the SWC and joined the Missouri Valley Intercollegiate Athletic Association. In 1928, this conference split, and OU remained aligned with the teams that formed the Big Six Conference. Over the next 31 years, more schools were added and the conference underwent several name changes, incrementing the number each time up to the Big Eight Conference where it remained until 1996. Four Texas schools joined with the members of Big Eight to form the current Big 12 Conference.

When combined with Blake Griffin's John Wooden Award and Sam Bradford's Heisman Trophy, Oklahoma became the second school to have a top winner in both basketball and football in the same year (in 1968, Gary Beban won the Heisman Trophy and Kareem Abdul-Jabbar won the USBWA "Player of the Year" award for UCLA).

Football

The Sooners have been participating in college football since 1895. Calling Gaylord Family Oklahoma Memorial Stadium at Owen Field home, the team has won numerous bowl games, 50 conference championships (including every Big Seven championship awarded), and seven Associated Press National Championships, making the Sooners football program the most decorated in the Big 12. Oklahoma has scored the most points in Division I-A football history despite the fact they have played over 60 fewer games than the second place school on that list. OU also has the highest winning percentage of any team since the start of the AP poll in 1936.

The Sooners possess 7 national championships in football, with 1950, 1955, 1956, 1974, 1975, 1985, and 2000 seasons featuring the top team in the Associated Press final poll, and the 2000 Bowl Championship Series National Championship as well. This number is 3rd only to the Alabama Crimson Tide (12) and the Notre Dame Fighting Irish (8) for the most AP titles of any Division I college football team after the end of World War II (which is commonly used as the division between eras in college football).

In addition to these seven acknowledged national championships there are also ten additional years in which the NCAA's official record book lists other selections (mostly by math rating systems) of the Sooners as national champions, with the first four years in retrospect: 1915, 1949, 1953, 1957, 1967, 1973, 1978, 1980, 1986, 2003. In general, math formula rankings are not recognized as national championships. The University of Oklahoma does not acknowledge these additional "championships", as they were not awarded by the Associated Press, United Press International (UPI), USA Today Coaches Poll, or the Bowl Championship Series (BCS).

Individual success is also a major part of Oklahoma football; seven Heisman Trophy winners (Billy Vessels, Steve Owens, Billy Sims, Jason White, Sam Bradford Baker Mayfield, and Kyler Murray) are surrounded by many other award winners, including NFL MVP Award winner Adrian Peterson, Joe Washington, Brian Bosworth, Tony Casillas, Greg Pruitt, Josh Heupel, Jerry Tubbs, Rocky Calmus, Granville Liggins, Teddy Lehman, Lee Roy Selmon, Roy Williams, Tommy McDonald, Mark Clayton, Tommie Harris, J. C. Watts, Keith Jackson, and Jammal Brown. More than a dozen Sooner players have been inducted into the College Football Hall of Fame. Oklahoma has more Butkus award winners than any other school.

Coaches Bennie Owen, Bud Wilkinson, Barry Switzer and Bob Stoops have passed through the game-day tunnel for the Sooners, each on his way to the College Football Hall of Fame. Owen was the first highly successful coach at OU and was a major advocate of the forward pass, which at the turn of the century was not popular. The playing surface at Oklahoma's Gaylord Family Oklahoma Memorial Stadium is popularly known as Owen Field in honor of his long tenure and devotion to the university. Wilkinson left many imprints on the game, such as the 5–2 defense with five linemen and two linebackers; the perfection of the Split-T, an early option offense; three national championships; and his teams set the NCAA Division 1 record for consecutive wins at 47 (started October 10, 1953, vs. Texas and ended in 1957 with a loss to Notre Dame 7–0). Switzer won three national championships (the National Championship of 1975 is highly controversial; Arizona State went 12–0 that season while Oklahoma was 11–1) and forged arguably the fiercest rushing offense ever, the Oklahoma wishbone formation, throughout the 1970s and 1980s. Though the end of Switzer's tenure at Oklahoma was marked by controversy and poor player behavior, he is generally well regarded by both his past players and Sooner fans. During his 16 years as the Sooners' head coach, Switzer led his team to 12 conference championships and never lost more than two games in a row. His winning percentage of .837 stands as the fourth-highest in the history of 1-A football. Other Hall of Fame coaches whose tenure included stints at the University of Oklahoma are Lawrence "Biff" Jones and Jim Tatum.

Baseball

The Oklahoma Baseball tradition is long, proud and storied, with two National Championships in 1951 and 1994, along with numerous All-Americans. Their home field is L. Dale Mitchell Baseball Park, named after famed player Dale Mitchell. The current coach is Skip Johnson. The baseball program was a source of recent controversy when the head coach, Larry Cochell, resigned after making racially insensitive remarks about one of the players on the team.

During the 2005–2006 season, the Sooners were given a home regional at L. Dale Mitchell Park and were named the No. 1 seed. They beat the University of Houston, Texas Christian University, and Wichita State University to win the regional and advanced to a Super Regional where they were defeated by Rice University in a best-of-three series. Oregon State University went on to win the College World Series that year.

Prior to 2006, the Sooners hosted regionals at minor league parks in Oklahoma City, first All Sports Stadium and then AT&T Bricktown Ballpark. Scheduling conflicts with the Oklahoma Redhawks, the Class AAA affiliate of the Houston Astros, led OU to bid for future regionals at its on-campus stadium.

Men's basketball

The men's basketball team is highly successful and rose to national prominence since the early 80s with head coach Billy Tubbs and three time All-American power forward Wayman Tisdale. It currently plays in the Lloyd Noble Center, which came to be known as the house Alvan Adams built and Tisdale filled. While the team has never won a national championship, it ranks second in most tournament wins without a championship behind Illinois. The team played in the 1988 national championship game but lost to Kansas, despite having beaten the Jayhawks twice earlier in the season. The program has won a combined twenty regular-season and tournament conference championships.

The Sooners headed into the 2005–06 season ranked No. 5 in the AP preseason poll, led by Taj Gray, Kevin Bookout, Terrell Everett, and David Godbold, but had a disappointing early season. After the emergence of Michael Neal as a potential star, the Sooners salvaged a No. 3 seed in the Big 12 Conference Tournament but lost in the first round of the NCAA Tournament.

On March 29, 2006, Kelvin Sampson left the University of Oklahoma to become the head basketball coach at Indiana University. 13 days later, on April 11, 2006, Oklahoma Athletic Director Joe Castiglione named Jeff Capel III the new head coach. Capel encountered trouble in his first few months as several players who had been recruited by Sampson backed out of their commitments. Also, under Sampson's watch, Oklahoma was placed under a three-year investigation by the NCAA for recruiting violations. At the end of their investigation, the NCAA issued a report citing more than 550 illegal calls made by Sampson and his staff to 17 different recruits. The NCAA barred Sampson from recruiting off campus and making phone calls for one year, ending May 24, 2007. The Sooners looked to continue a streak of 12 consecutive postseason tournament appearances in 2006–2007, but were disappointed when they did not receive a bid for either the NCAA Tournament or the NIT.

In the 2009 NBA draft, the Sooners produced the No. 1 overall draft selection Blake Griffin.

Women's basketball

OU women's basketball began during the 1974–75 academic year. It wasn't until 1996 when OU hired local high school basketball coach, Sherri Coale, that the team became something Sooners would be proud of. At one time the team drew an average of 65 people per game, now the Sooners are one of the nation's leaders in attendance. In 2002, Oklahoma advanced to the National Title game before losing to the Connecticut Huskies.

Men's golf
The men's golf team has won 14 conference championships:
Big Eight Conference (12): 1935, 1938, 1941, 1946–48, 1951–52, 1955–57, 1992 (co-champions in 1947 and 1955)
Big 12 Conference (2): 2006, 2018

The Sooners won the NCAA Championship in 1989 and 2017. OU has also crowned two individual national champions: Walter Emery in 1933 and Jim Vickers in 1952.

Several Sooners have had successful amateur and professional careers after college: Charles Coe (1949 and 1958 U.S. Amateur winner), Glen Day (one PGA Tour win), Todd Hamilton (two PGA Tour wins including 2004 Open Championship), Anthony Kim (three PGA Tour wins), Andrew Magee (four PGA Tour wins), Craig Perks (one PGA Tour win), Greg Turner (four European Tour wins), Grant Waite (one PGA Tour win) and Abraham Ancer (winner of 2018 Emirates Australian Open).

Men's gymnastics

The men's gymnastics program at OU is headed by coach Mark Williams. It has won twelve NCAA Men's Gymnastics Championships, including five in a span of seven years in 2002, 2003, 2005, 2006 and 2008 (they finished second behind Penn State in 2004 and 2007). They won the 2006 title with very little experience on the team as 50% of the members were freshmen and just 21% were upperclassmen (seven freshmen, four sophomores, one junior, and two seniors). Teams from OU also won national championships in 1977, 1978, 1991, and back to back to back championships in 2015, 2016 and 2017. In 2015, the Sooners broke the NCAA scoring record in a duel meet against Michigan scoring 456.4 points and then broke their own record two weeks later against Illinois scoring 457.3 points.

Gymnastics began at the school in 1902. The program folded in 1917 when the original coach left. The program was revived in 1965 with the new coach, Russ Porterfield having to beg students to join the squad. Within 6 years, OU had its first winning season. OU's next coach, Paul Ziert, turned the program into one of national prominence. He led OU to two national championships in 1977 and 1978. One of Ziert's athletes, Greg Buwick, would replace him as head coach in 1980 and would lead the team to its third national title in 1991. Buwick's assistant of 12 years, Mark Williams, took over the head coaching position in 2000 and has led the Sooners to six national championships, thirteen conference titles, several individual champions, and even more All-Americans. OU has produced more Nissen Award winners than any other university and is the only school to have back-to-back Nissen Award winners.

Women's gymnastics

The women's gymnastics program is headed by K. J. Kindler. The Sooners have won 14 Big 12 conference titles, 8 regional championships, and five national championship titles (2014, a co-championship with Florida and in 2016, 2017, 2019 and 2022). The Sooners have also won seven individual titles in their history, with Kelly Garrison (all-around in 1987; all-around, bars and beam in 1988), Taylor Spears (beam in 2014), Nicole Lehrmann (bars in 2017), and Maggie Nichols (bars in 2017) claiming honors.

Women's rowing
On May 10, 2007, the University announced the addition of women's rowing to the intercollegiate athletics program started by well-respected rower Candie Garrett. The University hired head coach Leeanne Crain in the spring of 2008. Assistant Coaches Kris Muhl and Andrew Derrick followed Crain from the University of Central Florida to jumpstart OU's program. Muhl took a head coaching position at Jacksonville University during summer 2009. Former UVA rower and Alabama Novice coach Marina Traub was hired as the varsity assistant coach in Fall 2009.

The University of Oklahoma women's rowing team practices in the Oklahoma City River (formerly the Canadian River), located in the Bricktown area of Oklahoma City. The river was designated as a U.S. Olympic Training Center for the sports of kayaking, canoeing, and rowing on July 28, 2009. The University's boathouse was completed in 2011.

Women's soccer
The women's soccer team plays in the Big 12 Conference. Their home ground is John Crain Field in the OU Soccer Complex.

 the head coach is Mark Carr, a graduate of Bournemouth University, who was formerly head coach of the United States women's national under-20 soccer team.

Softball 

The OU softball program qualified four times for the AIAW WCWS (1975, 1980, 1981, 1982) and 14 times for the Women's College World Series (Division I) (2000, 2001, 2002, 2003, 2004, 2011, 2012, 2013, 2014, 2016, 2017, 2018, 2019 and 2021).

In October 1994, OU hired Patty Gasso as the fifth head coach in program history. In 28 years, she has built OU into one of the premier collegiate softball programs in the nation. Within her first five seasons in Norman, Gasso led the Sooners to the final Big Eight championship (1995) and two Big 12 titles (1996 and 1999).

In 2000, Oklahoma won its first Women's College World Series title by defeating perennial power UCLA. It marked the first national championship by a women's athletics program in school history. OU rolled through the 2013 season en route to its second WCWS title. The 2016 Sooners won the program's third national title while starting four sophomores and four freshmen. Despite entering the 2017 postseason tournament as a No. 10 national seed, OU won its second consecutive WCWS title and fourth overall. Game One of the WCWS champion series featured a 17-inning thriller in which the Sooners defeated Florida 7-5. The 2021 WCWS saw OU drop its opener to James Madison before rebounding to earn a spot in the championship series against Florida State. The Sooners defeated the Seminoles in three games to win the program's fifth national title.

Men's and women's track and field 
The men's and women's outdoor track and field teams host meets at the John Jacobs Track and Field Complex. The men's and women's indoor track and field teams host meets at the Mosier Indoor Track Facility.

Wrestling

The Sooner wrestling program was established in 1920 and is the fourth most decorated in college wrestling, having won seven NCAA national championships in 1936, 1951, 1952, 1957, 1960, 1963 and 1974. The Sooners are considered a power in their own right and Bedlam matches draw big home crowds, with the Howard McCasland Field House being the home for Sooner Wrestling. There are numerous All-Americans and National Champions that have wrestled for the Oklahoma Sooners. Mark Cody was head coach of the program for five years before his resignation in 2016. During his time, Cody coached the Sooners to 10th in 2014. Under Cody, the Sooners had ten All-Americans and two national champions (Kendric Maple and Cody Brewer). His replacement was Lou Rosselli, a former assistant at Ohio State.

Notable Oklahoma Sooner wrestlers include:
 Melvin Douglas – 2-time NCAA Champion, World Champion, and 8 time U.S. National Champion in freestyle wrestling
 Tommy Evans – 2-time NCAA Champion and 2-time NCAA Outstanding Wrestler
 Jared Frayer – 2-time NCAA All-American and National Finalist, competed at 2012 Summer Olympics
 Dan Hodge – 3-time NCAA Champion, 2-time Outstanding Wrestler, and namesake of Dan Hodge Trophy award which is awarded to America's best college wrestler
 Mickey Martin – 3-time NCAA Champion and NCAA Outstanding Wrestler
 Dave Schultz – NCAA, World and Olympic Champion 
 Mark Schultz – 3-time NCAA Champion, NCAA Outstanding Wrestler, 2-time World Champion and Olympic Champion
 Wayne Wells – NCAA, World and Olympic Champion

Oklahoma Sooner Wrestling team accomplishments: 
 23 Conference Titles
 263 All-Americans
 65 individual NCAA Champions
 7 NCAA Championships: 1936, 1951, 1952, 1957, 1960, 1963 and 1974

Notable non-varsity sports

Rugby
Oklahoma plays college rugby in the Allied Rugby Conference of Division 1A. Oklahoma has participated several times in the Collegiate Rugby Championship (CRC), often matching up against rival Texas. The CRC, held every year at PPL Park in Philadelphia, is the highest profile college rugby competition in the US, and is broadcast live on NBC each year.

The Oklahoma University Rugby Football Club was established in 1974. OU Rugby has experienced success since its founding, including an undefeated record in the 1983–1984 season, and reached the national quarter-finals five times from 1980 to 1990. The early 2000s saw Oklahoma return to its winning ways, winning the Big 12 Rugby Tournament four times. The captain of that squad, All American Tyson Meek, played for the US national rugby team, and went on to become OU's first professional rugby player. Oklahoma finished the 2005 season with a 19–1 record.

Rivalries

Nebraska Cornhuskers

A traditional college football rivalry with the Nebraska Cornhuskers was much less intense during the Big 12 years than it was in the Big 8 era. This was mainly due to the split-division nature of the Big 12 that only allowed the teams to play each other twice every four years. Prior to this, these teams were involved in several historic match-ups, including the Game of the Century and the so-called Game of the New Century where the teams have come into the game ranked one and two in the Associated Press poll, making the games of great importance in deciding the national championship. Historically, the rivalry's most distinguishing quality has been the grudging respect and appreciation between the two tradition-rich programs. Also of note is the game's former status as the premier Thanksgiving Day game for the middle of the country. The Sooners and Cornhuskers went head-to-head in the 2006 Big 12 Championship Game, with Oklahoma winning the conference title by the score of 21–7. The two teams also met in the 2010 Big 12 Championship Game, with Oklahoma again the victor in a close game by a score of 23–20. This turned out to be the final conference meeting between the two teams, as Nebraska departed for the Big Ten Conference the following season.

Oklahoma State Cowboys

Oklahoma's shares an intrastate rivalry with the Oklahoma State Cowboys and is often referred to as the "Bedlam Series." It is normally played as a home-and-home series with games alternating between Norman and Stillwater, with the exception of the baseball teams, who often play at Chickasaw Bricktown Ballpark in Oklahoma City or ONEOK Field in Tulsa. Oklahoma currently leads the series 86–18–7 in football, and 124–88 in basketball In baseball the series is tied at 147–147, and in wrestling Oklahoma trails the series 27–128–9.

Texas Longhorns

The Texas Longhorns are one rival of the Sooners. Regardless of the trademark implications, inverted versions of the Longhorn mascot can be seen on automobiles all over the Norman campus, and many T-shirts referring to the rivalry present the word "Texas" in mirror image, upside-down, or possibly surrounded by obscenities. A reminder of the rivalry shared by these two schools was painted on the South Oval of the OU campus for many years, and was recently replicated near the Library clock tower due to construction at its original site.

The annual game between the schools at the Cotton Bowl in Dallas, Texas, known as the Red River Showdown, is a game that draws attention from all around the college football world.

Traditions
The "fight song" of the University of Oklahoma is "Boomer Sooner", a version of "Boola Boola", the fight song of Yale University, combined with a version of "I'm a Tar Heel Born", the fight song of the University of North Carolina at Chapel Hill. "Boomer Sooner" was written by Arthur M. Alden in 1905. Other songs played at athletic events by The Pride of Oklahoma Marching Band are a version of Rodgers and Hammerstein's "Oklahoma!", "OK Oklahoma", played after extra points, and the "OU Chant." At home games, The Pride of Oklahoma Marching Band plays that visiting team's "fight song" while facing their fans.

The Mascot present at all football games is the Sooner Schooner, a Conestoga wagon, pulled by two crème white ponies, Boomer and Sooner. The caretakers of the wagon are the spirit group called the RUF/NEKS, who shoot off modified shotguns in celebration of scores by the home team. The group was launched in 1915 when an elderly female spectator at an OU-Oklahoma A&M basketball game chided the group for raising hell ("Sit down and be quiet, you roughnecks!")

Recently, in time for the 2005 football season, two new mascots, based on the ponies who pull the Schooner, were created, named appropriately, Boomer and Sooner. They are costumes of two identical (except for eye color) crème white ponies. Before, the Boomer and Sooner costume mascots, OU was also represented by Top Dawg. Top Dawg did some appearances at football games, but was primarily used at wrestling and basketball events.

The official school colors are Crimson and Cream, with red and white sometimes used as substitutes for simplicity. The school logo is an interlocking OU design.

Championships

National Team Championships

SoonerSports.TV

SoonerSports.tv is a streaming network and programming block founded in 2012 to carry University of Oklahoma sports programming. The network is operated by Bally Sports and the University of Oklahoma. SoonerSports.tv focuses solely on University of Oklahoma athletics. The network carries live sporting events, game replays, coaches shows, vignettes and historical pieces. The live sports that currently air on the network include one football game through pay per view, one men's basketball game, and select games from baseball, softball, volleyball, wrestling, soccer, and men’s and women’s gymnastics.

Select men's and women's basketball games, select softball, and select baseball games, are also distributed to the regional Bally Sports networks and their affiliates as part of the programming block.

The network was created in 2012 as part of an agreement with the Fox Sports Networks. In 2021, following the re branding of the Fox Sports Networks to Bally Sports, Bally Sports took over operation. On May 5, 2022 it was announced that SoonerSports.TV will be ending and will be rebrand as Soonervision on ESPN + under a multi-year deal with ESPN. .

References

External links